"Everybody Dance" is a song by American band Chic. The disco song, which features Norma Jean Wright on lead vocals and Luther Vandross, Diva Gray, Robin Clark and David Lasley on background vocals, was released as the second single from the band's self-titled debut album Chic (1977). According to guitarist Nile Rodgers, it was the first song specifically written for Chic, and, due to its historical status and popularity, is usually played as the opening song of the band's live set. It was later heavily sampled by British group Steps on their song "Stomp" and echoed by the Manic Street Preachers on their single "(It's Not War) Just the End of Love".

The song has featured in films such as  The Last Days of Disco (1998) and Summer of Sam (1999) during the orgy scene, and is also featured in the Grand Theft Auto IV expansion pack The Ballad of Gay Tony on the radio station K109.

According to Rodgers speaking for the BBC4 documentary "How to Make It in the Music Business", the session the song was recorded during cost the band $10, which went on bribing the elevator engineer not to tell the manager they were recording in there.

Release
Unlike most Chic singles, its 12" version was not included on a regular album, nor was it widely available upon original release, with the 12" format being issued only as a promo. The extended 12" version has, however, subsequently been issued on numerous compilations. Also unlike most Chic singles, the b-side "You Can Get By" was edited down from the original album track; almost all future Chic b-sides would be presented in their full-length versions.

Reception
Cash Box praised the "fine, flashy bass work, double-timing on the high-hat and handclapping." Record World said that the "good melody and arrangement" should allow the song's appeal to expand beyond Chic's previous dance audience.

Chart performance
"Everybody Dance" became another hit for the band in the United States, peaking at number 38 on the Billboard Hot 100 chart in 1978. In the UK Singles chart, it reached number 9 in May 1978, spending 9 weeks in the Top 40 there.

Track listing and formats
Atlantic 7" 3469, 1978
A. "Everybody Dance" (7" Edit) - 3:30
B. "You Can Get By" (7" Edit) - 3:59

Atlantic promo 12" DSKO 109, 1978
A. "Everybody Dance" (12" Mix) - 8:25
B. "You Can Get By" - 5:36

Atlantic 12" DK 4621, 1978 / Atlantic Oldies promo 12" DSKO 179, 1979
A. "Everybody Dance" (12" Mix) - 8:25
B. "Dance, Dance, Dance (Yowsah, Yowsah, Yowsah)" - 8:21

Charts

Certifications

Cover versions
1990s
In 1993, RuPaul recorded a version of the song for his debut album Supermodel of the World.
In 1993, British dance group Evolution scored a UK Top 20 hit with a house cover of the track, released on Deconstruction Records. The extended version was appropriately titled 'Chic Inspirational Mix'.
2000s
In 2007, Canadian singer Deborah Cox reinterpreted the track as "Everybody Dance (Clap Your Hands)", incorporating a sample of the original Chic vocals in the mix. The track briefly hit the US Hot Dance Club Songs Chart, peaking at No.17.
2010s
In 2011, English singer Kimberley Walsh covered the song for Horrid Henry: The Movie.

References

1978 singles
Chic (band) songs
Songs written by Bernard Edwards
Songs written by Nile Rodgers
Song recordings produced by Nile Rodgers
Song recordings produced by Bernard Edwards
1977 songs
Atlantic Records singles
Songs about dancing